Leonid Grigorievich Geishtor; also Geyshtor (born October 15, 1936, in Homel, Belarusian SSR) is a Soviet-born Belarusian sprint canoeist who competed in the late 1950s and early 1960s.

Life and career
Geishtor is Jewish. He trained at Vodnik in Gomel. Along with teammate Sergei Makarenko, Geishtor won the first Olympic gold medal by a Belarusian competitor.  The two won the C-2 1000 m event at the 1960 Summer Olympics in Rome.

Geishtor was awarded the Order of the Badge of Honor in 1960.

He also won a gold medal in the C-2 10000 m event at the 1963 ICF Canoe Sprint World Championships in Jajce.

See also
List of select Jewish canoeists

References

1936 births
Belarusian male canoeists
Canoeists at the 1960 Summer Olympics
Jewish Belarusian sportspeople
Living people
Olympic canoeists of the Soviet Union
Olympic gold medalists for the Soviet Union
Soviet male canoeists
Soviet Jews
Olympic medalists in canoeing
Sportspeople from Gomel
ICF Canoe Sprint World Championships medalists in Canadian
Medalists at the 1960 Summer Olympics
International Jewish Sports Hall of Fame inductees